Jean Eric Rehn (18 May 1717, Stockholm - 19 May 1793, Stockholm) was a Swedish architect, engraver and designer.

Biography 
His father, Eric, was a government ombudsman for the Sámi people. In 1740, at the age of twenty-three, he went to Paris to study etching, with the help of a government grant. There, he worked in the studios of Jacques-Philippe Le Bas, creating hunting scenes.

In addition to his work at the factories, he made designs for jewelers, carpenters and the Rörstrand Porcelain company; designed wallpaper for the French weavers employed by the Royal Family and made engravings for medals. He also served as drawing teacher for Crown Prince (later King) Gustav III and his brothers.

Two years later, at the expense of Queen Louisa Ulrika, he accompanied the painter, Johan Pasch, to France and Italy. He returned after sixteen months and was named a Professor of the Royal Drawing Academy in 1757.  

He was heavily employed by the Royal Court as well, doing interior design work for Queen Louisa at Drottningholm Palace. Later, in 1779, he oversaw the changes at Gripsholm Castle and Stockholm Palace, which had been ordered by King Gustav III. He also redecorated parts of the Bollhuset (1772) and designed furniture with Georg Haupt. 

Although he is mostly remembered for his interior work, his building designs were also significant. Around 1760, he was hired by the industrialist, Charles de Geer, to design a library, aviary and two new wings for his home in Lövstabruk. He also made drawings for Stora Wäsby Castle and Ljung Castle, among others. 

He had resigned all of his official positions by 1789, but was still active as an engraver; visiting Rome to draw the ancient buildings there. His works are represented at the Nationalmuseum and the Gothenburg Museum of Art.

Sources

 Biography @ the Svenskt biografiskt lexikon

External links

 Works by Rehn, in the collection of the Nationalmuseum
 Brief biography and works @ the Gothenburg Museum

1717 births
1793 deaths
Swedish architects
Swedish engravers
Swedish designers
Swedish interior designers
Artists from Stockholm